The discography of Elisa, an Italian singer-songwriter, consists of eleven studio albums, forty-one singles, five compilation albums and five DVDs.

Albums

Studio albums

Compilation albums

Live albums

Video albums 
 Lotus (2003)
 Pearl Days (2004)
 Soundtrack '96-'06 (2006)
 Soundtrack Live '96–'06 (2007)

Extended plays

Singles

As lead artist

As featured artist

International singles 
 1997 – "Sleeping in Your Hand"
 1997 – "Labyrinth"
 1998 – "So Delicate So Pure" (only Netherlands)
 2000 – "Gift"
 2000 – "Asile's World"
 2001 – "Luce (tramonti a nord-est)"
 2001 – "Fever" (only Germany)
 2002 – "Come Speak to Me"
 2002 – "Háblame" (only Spain)
 2002 – "Heaven (Out of Hell)"
 2005 – "Swan"
 2006 – "Teach Me Again" (with Tina Turner)
 2007 – "One Step Away"
 2007 – "Sentir sin embargo"
 2007 – "Stay"
 2007 – "Dancing"
 2008 – "Rainbow"
 2009 – "Rock Your Soul" (US promo)
 2011 – "Love Is Requited" (US and Canada)

Other album appearances

Notes

Discographies of Italian artists
Pop music discographies